Stephen F. Kolzak (born 19 February 1953 in Hartford, CT - died 19 September 1990 in Los Angeles, CA) was an American Los Angeles casting director.

He is best known for Altered States (1980), Cheers (1982) and Bachelor Party (1984). He is reported to have chosen the Cheers cast.

In the last two years of his life, he was in a long-term relationship with his partner Paul Monette.

He devoted the last part of his life to fighting homophobia and AIDS-phobia within the entertainment industry.

The GLAAD Stephen F. Kolzak Award given to an openly LGBT member of the entertainment or media community for his or her work toward eliminating homophobia has been awarded since 1991, with Kolzak being the posthumous inaugural recipient.

References

American casting directors
1953 births
1990 deaths
American LGBT rights activists
People from Hartford, Connecticut
People from Los Angeles
AIDS-related deaths in California